The 2017 Florida A&M Rattlers football team represented Florida A&M University in the 2017 NCAA Division I FCS football season. The Rattlers were led by third-year head coach Alex Wood. They played their home games at Bragg Memorial Stadium. They were a member of the Mid-Eastern Athletic Conference (MEAC). They finished the season 3–8, 2–6 in MEAC play to finish in a three-way tie for eighth place.

On November 20, head coach Alex Wood resigned. He finished at Florida A&M with a three-year record of 8–25.

Schedule

 Source: Schedule

Game summaries

Texas Southern

at Arkansas

vs Tennessee State

at Savannah State

North Carolina Central

at Norfolk State

North Carolina A&T

at Hampton

at Morgan State

Howard

vs Bethune–Cookman

References

Florida AandM
Florida A&M Rattlers football seasons